Karthaus is an unincorporated community in Clearfield County, Pennsylvania, United States. Karthaus has a post office with ZIP code 16845, which opened on April 24, 1826. The community was named after Peter A. Karthaus, the proprietor of a local blast furnace.

References

Unincorporated communities in Clearfield County, Pennsylvania
Unincorporated communities in Pennsylvania